The Church of St Mary the Virgin, Plumtree is a parish church in the Church of England in Plumtree, Nottinghamshire.

The church is Grade II listed by the Department for Digital, Culture, Media and Sport as it is a building of special architectural or historic interest.

History

The church is medieval but was heavily restored between 1873 and 1874, by George Frederick Bodley and Thomas Garner. The tower was rebuilt in 1906 by Percy Heylyn Currey. Stained glass in the east of the chancel is said to be by Burlison and Grylls.

The church had an early clock by Richard Roe in 1686. This was replaced in 1889.

References

Church of England church buildings in Nottinghamshire
Grade II listed churches in Nottinghamshire